Corti is an Italian surname. Notable people with the surname include:

Alfonso Giacomo Gaspare Corti (1822–1876), Italian anatomist (see also Organ of Corti)
Antonio Corti (born 1963), Argentine boxer
Axel Corti (1933–1993), Austrian writer and film director
Bonaventura Corti (1729–1813), Italian priest and naturalist
Claudio Corti (climber), Italian mountaineer
Eugenio Corti (1921–2014), Italian novelist
Horacio Pietragalla Corti
Jean Corti (1929–2015), Italian-French accordionist and composer
Jesse Corti, American voice actor
Lodovico, Count Corti (1823–1888), Italian diplomat
Lucille Teasdale-Corti (1929–1996), Canadian physician and international aid worker

See also
Monchio delle Corti, a municipality in the Province of Parma, Italy 
José Corti, a Paris library and publishing house
Organ of Corti, an organ in the inner ear of mammals

Italian-language surnames